The Olive Hotel is a National Registered Historic Place located in Miles City, Montana.  It was added to the Register on October 13, 1988.

The hotel was built in 1898–1899, and it was enlarged in 1908 by a three-story addition at the rear, plus by a new entry and redecorated lobby at the front.  It has two poured concrete garages across the alley to the rear, built in 1908 and 1912, which are contributing buildings in the listing.

It is a contributing property in the Main Street Historic District, NRHP-listed in 1989.  The NRHP nomination document for that district categorized it as a Renaissance Revival-style building.

References

External links

Hotel buildings completed in 1899
Buildings and structures in Miles City, Montana
Hotel buildings on the National Register of Historic Places in Montana
Hotels established in 1899
1899 establishments in Montana
National Register of Historic Places in Custer County, Montana
Individually listed contributing properties to historic districts on the National Register in Montana